may refer to:

Places
 Saitama (city), the capital and the most populous city of Saitama Prefecture, Japan
 Saitama Prefecture, a prefecture of Japan in the Kantō region
 Kita-Saitama District, Saitama
 Minami-Saitama District, Saitama

Sports 
 Saitama SC, a football club 
 Saitama Seibu Lions, a baseball club
  Saitama Ageo Medics, a volleyball club
 Saitama Stadium, a football (soccer) stadium in Saitama, Saitama Prefecture, Japan
 Saitama Stadium 2002, a football stadium in Midori-ku, Saitama City, Saitama Prefecture, Japan
 Saitama Super Arena, an arena in Saitama, Saitama Prefecture, Japan

Transportation 
 Saitama-Shintoshin Station, a railway station in Ōmiya-ku, Saitama, Saitama Prefecture, Japan
 Saitama New Urban Transit, operator of the New Shuttle operated in the Greater Tokyo Area in Japan
 Saitama Rapid Railway Line, a railway line

Other
 Television Saitama or Teletama, a commercial station in Urawa-ku, Saitama, Saitama Prefecture, Japan
 5618 Saitama, a main-belt asteroid
 Saitama (One-Punch Man), title character of the web comic, manga and anime series One-Punch Man

See also
 Sakitama (disambiguation), a different reading of 埼玉